Karawa Airport  is an airport serving the town of Karawa in Nord-Ubangi Province, Democratic Republic of the Congo.

See also

 Transport in the Democratic Republic of the Congo
 List of airports in the Democratic Republic of the Congo

References

External links
 OurAirports - Karawa
 FallingRain - Karawa Airport
 HERE Maps - Karawa
 OpenStreetMap - Karawa
 

Airports in the Nord-Ubangi Province